Planococcus is a genus of Gram-Positive or Gram-variable, cocci or short rod-shaped bacteria in the family Caryophanaceae from the order Caryophanales. The type species of this genus is Planococcus citreus.

Some members of Planococcus are previously species belonging to Planomicrobium. Instead of branching with species from Planomicrobum, these species formed a monophyletic branch with members of Planococcus in various phylogenetic trees constructed based on conserved genome sequences, indicating their phylogenetic relatedness. The family Caryophanaceae encompassed many branching anomalies such as this one, partially due to the reliance on 16S rRNA sequences as a method for classification, which is known to have low resolution power and give differing results depending on the algorithm used. In 2020, a comparative genomic study emended the family, resulting in the establishment of three new genera as well as the amendment of a number of genera including Planococcus. 

The name Planococcus is derived from the Greek noun planes, translating into "a wanderer" and the Latin term coccus. Together, Planococcus can be translated as a motile coccus.

Biochemical Characteristics and Molecular Signatures 
Cells exhibit Gram-positive or Gram-variable staining and they are cocci or short rods and generally motile.

Genomic analyses identified five conserved signature indels (CSIs) that are uniquely present in members of this genus in the following proteins: penicillin-binding protein 2, hypothetical protein, NADPH-dependent 7-cyano-7-deazaguanine reductase QueF, ACT domain-containing protein, and methylmalonyl-CoA mutase. These molecular signatures provide a reliable method for differentiating Planococcus species from other genera within the family Caryophanaceae and all other bacteria.

Taxonomy 
Planococcus, as of 2021, contains 24 species with validly published names. This genus was identified as a monophyletic clade and phylogenetically unrelated to other species in the family Caryophanaceae in studies examining the taxonomic relationships within the family.

References 

Bacillales
Bacteria genera